T6 or T-6 may refer to:

Aircraft
 Bikle T-6, a glider
 North American T-6 Texan, a World War II-era single-engine advanced trainer aircraft
 Beechcraft T-6 Texan II, a 2000's era single-engine turboprop trainer aircraft built by the Raytheon Aircraft Company

Automobiles
 Ford Ranger (T6), post-2011 models
 Volvo T6, a 2005 concept car from Volvo
 Volvo T6 engine, a turbocharged gasoline inline six used in the S60, V60, V70, XC70, S80 and XC90
 Volkswagen Transporter (T6), Sixth generation of the Volkswagen Transporter, and the latest iteration released in 2016

Biology and medicine
 Enterobacteria phage T6, a bacteriophage
 T6, an EEG electrode site according to the 10–20 system
 Sixth thoracic vertebra
 Thoracic spinal nerve 6

Pop culture
 Tekken 6, a 2007 fighting game
 Terminator: Dark Fate, the sixth film in the Terminator film franchise

Rail transport
 ALCO T-6, an American diesel switching (shunting) locomotive
 T6, a model of the OS T1000 train of the Oslo Metro
 Carlingford railway line, Sydney, Australia
 Île-de-France tramway Line 6, France
 T6 (Istanbul Tram) Light rail line in Istanbul, Turkey

Roads
 T6 road (Zambia)

Other uses
 Tavrey Airlines, by IATA airline designator
 T6, a size of Torx screwdriver
 T6 space, in topology, a perfectly normal Hausdorff space
 A temper designation for aluminium alloys, indicating 'solution heat treated and artificially aged'
 A tornado intensity rating on the TORRO scale
 A prototype of the U.S. M4 Sherman tank
 A military designation for Östgöta Logistic Corps